The Ministry of Investment and International Cooperation is the ministry in charge of economic cooperation and development between the Arab Republic of Egypt and the Arab States, foreign countries, and international and regional organizations. It also aids in economic and social development within Egypt. Its headquarters are located in Cairo.

Profile
The Ministry of International Cooperation was merged with the Ministry of Investment in September 2017. It is active in developing financial inclusion policy and is a member of the Alliance for Financial Inclusion. In late 2016, the ministry talked of receiving 120 million euros from the European Union for services to help the economically disadvantaged, for example, to expand the number of children receiving school meals, to aid families running small businesses, and to assist youth with employment skills.

Milestones
On 2 August 2017, the Minister, Sahar Nasar, reported that foreign investment in Egypt would exceed $10 Billion (US dollars). In 2016 Egyptian president Abdel Fattah el-Sisi had moved to float the Egyptian pound and this resulted in lower costs for doing business in Egypt.

In 2018, the Minister announced that Egypt is working to diversify foreign investment stressing several times that the goal is to create jobs. Nasr stated Egypt is working to attract investments from Europe and the US, and continues improvements in cutting red tape when doing business in Egypt. Nasr talked about the improved social stability and Egypt's focus on developing Sinai as a way of countering extremism.

Nasr announced that as of August 2018, sole proprietors can license their company's thanks to improvements made to Egypt's Company's Law and described the limited tax liability benefits to those Small and Medium-sized Enterprises.

Ministers
 Fayza Aboulnaga, 2007
 Fayza Aboulnaga (As Minister of Planning and International Cooperation) 2011 — 2012.
 Naglaa el-Ahwany was appointed on 17 June 2014 — 2015 
 Sahar Nasr, 15 September 2015 — 2019 
 Rania al-Mashat, 22 December 2019 — present.

See also

 Cabinet of Egypt

References

External links
Ministry of International Cooperation official webpage
 Ministry of International Cooperation on Facebook
Egypt's Cabinet Database

International Cooperation